Mahazza (Arabic: مهزة, Muhazza) is a village in Sitra, Bahrain, located in the eastern coast of the island. The Portuguese consulate is located in the village.

References

Sitra
Populated places in Bahrain